Hoàng Hoa Thám (1858 – 1913) also known as Commander Thám, was a Vietnamese feudal lord of Yên Thế, the leader of the Yên Thế Insurrection that held out against French protectorate in Tonkin for 30 years.

Biography

Born Đoàn Văn Nghĩa (段文義）in Tiên Lữ, Hưng Yên, Hoàng Hoa Thám (黃花探) was the better known adopted name whilst his nom-de-guerre was Đề Thám (提探). "Đề" is the shortened form of "Đề đốc" (提督), denoting the rank of a commander, an appellation adopted by Hoàng Hoa Thám as he was never commissioned by the Nguyễn court.

Hoàng Hoa Thám's parents had both died after joining a resistance group in the mountains rallying against the Court of Huế. Seeking anonymity, his paternal uncle fled to the Yên Thế area, changing the family name from Trương to Hoàng.

As the Protectorate consolidated control in Tonkin, French troops under Joseph Gallieni swept thru Yên Thế in 1890-91, routing most of the resistance fighters. Gallieni's campaign however was halted when Đề Thám attacked the railway, seizing trains, supplies and even capturing a local official for ransom. Against Gallieni's wishes, the French authorities agreed to make peace, granting Đề Thám a regional fiefdom. This made him the rallying cry for other anti-French movements. Subsequent military campaigns chipped away at the fiefdom but Đề Thám's exploits and fame proved to be a thorn in the flank of the Protectorate well into the early decades of the 20th century.

Death
Đề Thám's was assassinated in Thái Nguyên by one of his men, Lương Tam Kỳ, on 10 February (or March 18) 1913.

Thám's killer was a former commander in the Black Flag Army who had become an agent for the colonial French in Tonkin.

Legacy
Hoàng Hoa Thám is respected as a national hero in Vietnam. Many buildings and streets are named after him, but also Operation Hoàng Hoa Thám during the Vietnam War.

Family
 3 spouses: 
Nguyễn Thị Tảo (The First wife, mother of Cả Trọng)
Nguyễn Thị Quyên (The Second wife)
Đặng Thị Nho (Mrs Cẩn the Third, Vietnamese: bà Ba Cẩn, mother of Hoàng Thị Thế and Hoàng Văn Vi)
 4 sons:
Hoàng Đức Trọng (Cả Trọng),
Hoàng Văn Rinh (Cả Rinh, adopted son)
Hoàng Văn Huỳnh (Cả Huỳnh, adopted son)
Hoàng Văn Vi (Hoàng Bùi Phồn)
 1 daughter:
Hoàng Thị Thế (Marie Beatrice Destham)

References

External links

1858 births
1913 deaths
Vietnamese revolutionaries
Vietnamese nationalists
People from Hưng Yên Province